Veronica Brill is an American television presenter, commentator, recreational poker player and former medical data analyst. She has worked as a sideline reporter on NBC's long-running series Poker After Dark since 2021.

Brill first gained widespread notoriety in the late 2010s when she exposed strong circumstantial evidence that caused a major cheating scandal at a poker room in Sacramento where she occasionally played and worked as a color commentator on livestreamed broadcasts.

References

Living people
Year of birth missing (living people)